Martin Kotyza (born 1 October 1984) is a Czech football player who currently plays for FK Viktoria Žižkov.

References

External links
 
 

1984 births
Living people
Czech footballers
Czech First League players
FK Jablonec players
Bohemians 1905 players
FK Čáslav players
FC Sellier & Bellot Vlašim players
FK Viktoria Žižkov players
Association football midfielders